The Statesboro Bomb Scoring Site was a Strategic Air Command (SAC) Radar Bomb Scoring AUTOTRACK radar station. It was Formerly Used Defense Site I04GA0575. Detachment 3 of the 10th Radar Bomb Scoring Squadron had begun "Statesboro Bomb Plot" operations by June 1963.

In addition to a Reeves AN/MSQ-39 Bomb Scoring Central with fresnel antenna, during the Vietnam War the station used a Soviet T2A radar with 2 radomes for simulating surface-to-air missile tracking to train/exercise aircraft crews in electronic countermeasures (electronic warfare).

References

Installations of the United States Air Force in Georgia (U.S. state)
Formerly Used Defense Sites
Buildings and structures in Bulloch County, Georgia
Strategic Air Command radar stations
United States automatic tracking radar stations